Philip Lowry (born 15 July 1989) is a Northern Irish semi-professional footballer who plays as a midfielder for Crusaders. He has previously played for Portadown, Derry City, Linfield and Institute.

Club career
Lowry began his career at 18 years of age with local side Institute, attracting interest from Coleraine and having trials with Norwich City and Leicester City at the age of 19. He moved to Linfield in 2009 and went on to win several major honours with the Blues before leaving in 2014 for his hometown club Derry City. While with Linfield Lowry scored what turned out to be the winning goal in the 2010 Irish Cup final.

In January 2016 he joined Portadown on a short-term contract until the end of the season, with Lowry flying over from London every week to play. In the summer of 2016 it was announced that Lowry had joined the champions Crusaders. On the final day of the 2017–18 season, with Crusaders a goal behind and needing to win to be crowned champions, Lowry scored a 77th-minute equaliser against Ballymena United, with Crusaders going on to win the match and the league title.

Honours

Club
Institute
IFA Championship: 2006-07
IFA Intermediate Cup: 2006-07
North West Senior Cup: 2008-09

Linfield
IFA Premiership: 2009–10, 2010–11, 2011–12
Irish Cup: 2009–10, 2010–11, 2011–12
County Antrim Shield: 2013–14

Crusaders
NIFL Premiership: 2017–18
Irish Cup: 2018–19, 2021–22
County Antrim Shield: 2017–18, 2018–19

References

1989 births
Association footballers from Northern Ireland
Portadown F.C. players
Crusaders F.C. players
Living people
Association football midfielders
Derry City F.C. players
Institute F.C. players
Linfield F.C. players